In physics, spherical multipole moments are the coefficients in a series expansion of a potential that varies inversely with the distance  to a source, i.e., as  Examples of such potentials are the electric potential, the magnetic potential and the gravitational potential.

For clarity, we illustrate the expansion for a point charge, then generalize to an arbitrary charge density  Through this article, the primed coordinates such as  refer to the position of charge(s), whereas the unprimed coordinates such as  refer to the point at which the potential is being observed.

Spherical multipole moments of a point charge

If the radius  of the observation point is greater than the radius  of the charge, we may factor out 1/r and expand the square root in powers of  using Legendre polynomials

This is exactly analogous to the axial multipole expansion.

We may express  in terms of the coordinates of the observation point and charge position using the spherical law of cosines (Fig. 2)

Substituting this equation for  into the Legendre polynomials and factoring the primed and unprimed coordinates yields the important formula known as the spherical harmonic addition theorem

where the  functions are the spherical harmonics. Substitution of this formula into the potential yields

which can be written as

where the multipole moments are defined

As with axial multipole moments, we may also consider the case when the radius  of the observation point is less than the radius  of the charge. In that case, we may write

which can be written as

where the interior spherical multipole moments are defined as the complex conjugate of irregular solid harmonics

Exterior spherical multipole moments

It is straightforward to generalize these formulae by replacing the point charge  with an infinitesimal charge element  and integrating. The functional form of the expansion is the same. In the exterior case, where , the result is:

where the general multipole moments are defined

Note 

The potential Φ(r) is real, so that the complex conjugate of the expansion is equally valid. Taking of the complex conjugate leads to a definition of the multipole moment which is proportional to Yℓm, not to its complex conjugate. This is a common convention, see molecular multipoles for more on this.

Interior spherical multipole moments

Similarly, the interior multipole expansion has the same functional form. In the interior case, where , the result is:

with the interior multipole moments defined as

Interaction energies of spherical multipoles

A simple formula for the interaction energy of two non-overlapping but concentric charge distributions can be derived. Let the first charge distribution  be centered on the origin and lie entirely within the second charge distribution . The interaction energy between any two static charge distributions is defined by

The potential  of the first (central) charge distribution may be expanded in exterior multipoles

where  represents the  exterior multipole moment of the first charge distribution. Substitution of this expansion yields the formula

Since the integral equals the complex conjugate of the interior multipole moments  of the second (peripheral) charge distribution, the energy formula reduces to the simple form

For example, this formula may be used to determine the electrostatic interaction energies of the atomic nucleus with its surrounding electronic orbitals. Conversely, given the interaction energies and the interior multipole moments of the electronic orbitals, one may find the exterior multipole moments (and, hence, shape) of the atomic nucleus.

Special case of axial symmetry

The spherical multipole expansion takes a simple form if the charge distribution is axially symmetric (i.e., is independent of the azimuthal angle ). Using the mathematical identity

the exterior multipole expansion becomes

where the axially symmetric multipole moments are defined

In the limit that the charge is confined to the -axis, we recover the exterior axial multipole moments.

Similarly the interior multipole expansion becomes

where the axially symmetric interior multipole moments are defined

In the limit that the charge is confined to the -axis, we recover the interior axial multipole moments.

See also
 Solid harmonics
 Laplace expansion
 Multipole expansion
 Legendre polynomials
 Axial multipole moments
 Cylindrical multipole moments

Electromagnetism
Potential theory
Moment (physics)